Liberty Communications of Puerto Rico LLC (d/b/a Liberty) is a telecommunications company that provides broadband Internet access, VoIP, television and wireless services covering the entire island of Puerto Rico (wireless in Puerto Rico and US Virgin Islands). The company is headquartered in San Juan and has over a million television subscribers and over 1 million data customers.

History
During its existence as OneLink Communications, the company was owned by MidOcean Partners and Crestview Partners, which paid $250 million in June 1998 to buy the property from Adelphia. On June 25, 2012, it was rumored that Liberty Global might buy OneLink for $560 million USD. The rumors proved true, as Liberty Global acquired Onelink.

Liberty announced on December 27, 2012, that OneLink customers would no longer have a capped Internet; the previous limit was 40 GB per month, and it is now unlimited. Naji Khoury, executive director of Liberty Puerto Rico, said, "The use of the Internet has increased significantly in Puerto Rico and having access to it easy and rapidly has become a necessity in the daily life of Puerto Ricans."

On November 7, 2013, Liberty Puerto Rico announced that it would phase out the OneLink Communications brand, as well as the Choice Cable TV brand in November 2013, replacing it with Liberty. The same day, the company introduced a new logo.

It is wholly owned by Liberty Latin America following the split of Liberty Latin America from Liberty Global effective December 29, 2017 and the acquisition of the remaining 40% minority stake from Searchlight Capital partners on October 17, 2018 

On October 9, 2019, Liberty Cablevision of Puerto Rico's parent company (Liberty Latin America), announced the acquisition of AT&T Wireless Services in Puerto Rico and the U.S. Virgin Islands, in a $1.95 billion deal. The sale was completed on November 2, 2020. In May 2021, the company began promoting AT&T and Liberty as a unified brand. Also, during September 2021 Liberty began phasing out the AT&T brand and introduced a new logo.

Internet service upgrade history
 In March 2013, OneLink Communications began offering Internet speeds up to 10 Mbit/s download and 1 Mbit/s upload.
 In May 2013, OneLink Communications began offering Internet speeds up to 20 Mbit/s download and 2 Mbit/s upload.
 In June 2013, Onelink Communications began offering Internet speeds up to 40 Mbit/s download and 2 Mbit/s upload.
 As of 2021, the fastest Internet speeds offered by Liberty Puerto Rico are 600 Mbit/s download and 30 Mbit/s upload.

References

External links
 

Liberty Latin America
Companies based in San Juan, Puerto Rico
Internet service providers of Puerto Rico
Telecommunications companies of Puerto Rico